Myelopsis subtetricella is a species of snout moth in the genus Episcythrastis. It was described by Émile Louis Ragonot in 1889. It is found from Canada through the United States, as far south as southern California and Florida.

The wingspan is 19–22 mm.

The larvae feed on acorns.

References

Moths described in 1889
Phycitini